La Cueva Historic District, in Mora County, New Mexico near Mora, New Mexico, is a historic district which was listed on the National Register of Historic Places in 1973.

La Cueva Ranch was founded around 1851 by Vicente Romero.

The district includes a gristmill, a mercantile store and storage buildings, a ranch house and its out buildings, and San Rafael Church.  The two-story home was built in the 1850s by/for Vicente Romero.  The La Cueva mill, probably built in the 1870s, is a two-story stone and adobe building, built upon a stone foundation.

Historic function: Domestic; Religion; Industry/processing/extraction; Commerce/trade
Historic subfunction: Religious Structure; Single Dwelling; Manufacturing Facility; Specialty Store; Warehouse
Criteria: event, architecture/engineering

References

External links

Grinding mills
Historic American Engineering Record in New Mexico
National Register of Historic Places in Mora County, New Mexico
Historic districts on the National Register of Historic Places in New Mexico